Ethan J. Leib (September 15, 1975) is a law professor at Fordham Law School. He is the author of several books, including Deliberative Democracy in America: A Proposal for a Popular Branch of Government.

Leib was raised in Riverdale, Bronx. He received his B.A., M.A., and Ph.D. from Yale University, his J.D. from Yale Law School, and a M.Phil. from Cambridge University.

Leib clerked for Chief Judge John M. Walker, Jr., of the United States Court of Appeals for the Second Circuit. Before arriving at Fordham, Leib litigated at Debevoise & Plimpton LLP in New York City and taught at University of California, Hastings College of the Law.

References

External links 

 "Prawfsblog"  - law professors' blog including contributions by Leib.
 "Fordham Bio" 

1975 births
Living people
American bloggers
American legal scholars
American legal writers
Jewish American writers
Yale Law School alumni
University of California, Hastings faculty
Alumni of the University of Cambridge
21st-century American non-fiction writers
People associated with Debevoise & Plimpton
21st-century American Jews